Arkansas Traveler or Arkansas Traveller may refer to:

Musical album titles
Arkansas Traveler (Michelle Shocked album)
Arkansas Traveler (Breetles album) (1987), by the Breetles

Other titled works
The Arkansas Traveler (film), a 1938 American comedy film
"The Arkansas Traveler" (song), a fiddle tune by Sandford C. Faulkner
The Arkansas Traveler, an 1856 painting by Edward Payson Washbourne
The Arkansas Traveler (newspaper), student newspaper of the University of Arkansas
Arkansas Traveler (radio show), a bluegrass program on WDET, Detroit, Michigan
The Arkansas Traveler, the original title of The Bob Burns Show
Arkansas Traveler (web series), a 2017 western web series written by Sean Bridgers and starring Garret Dillahunt

Other uses
"The Arkansas Traveler", nickname and stage persona of Bob Burns
Arkansas Traveler (boat line) made by the Southwest Manufacturing Co. of Little Rock, Arkansas
Arkansas Traveler tomato, a variety of heirloom tomato
Arkansas Traveler (honorary title), a title of honor bestowed by the State of Arkansas
Arkansas Traveler, a humor magazine founded by Opie Read

See also
 Arkansas Travelers, a minor league baseball team in Little Rock, Arkansas
 Kit, the Arkansas Traveler, 1868 stage play